The fifth season of the American drama/adventure television series Highlander began airing 23 September 1996 and finished on 19 May 1997. The series continues to follow the adventures of Duncan MacLeod, a 400-year-old Immortal who, just as the Immortals of the movies, can only die if he is beheaded. MacLeod is involved in the Game, an ongoing battle during which all Immortals have to behead each other until only one is left.

Production
Two episodes that aired during the fifth season were the fourth season episodes "Double Jeopardy" (aired April 28, 1997) and "One Minute to Midnight" (aired September 23, 1996). These episodes are included in the fourth season DVD set.

Cast

Main cast
 Adrian Paul ... Duncan MacLeod
 Stan Kirsch ... Richie Ryan
 Jim Byrnes ... Joe Dawson

Recurring cast

 Awaovieyi Agie ... Jeffrey
 Réal Andrews ... Haresh Clay
 Claudie Arif ... Duenna
 Steve Bacic ... Luke
 Dean Balkwill ... David
 Terry Barclay ... Paco
 Geoffrey Bateman ... Richard Dunbar
 Jo Bates ... Glenda
 Mario Battista ... Big Gino
 Jeremy Beck ... Young Duncan MacLeod
 Sandra Bernhard ... Carolyn Marsh
 Lloyd Berry ... Harry
 Alex Bruhanski ... Reynaldo
 Lisa Butler ... Genevieve
 Felipe Calvarro ... Rafael
 Katie Carr ... Claire Clairmont
 Fulvio Cecere ... Alan Wilkinson
 Dolores Chaplin ... Theresa
 Kira Clavell ... Coyantu
 Allan Clow ... Neil MacGregor
 Sonia Codhant ... Marina LeMartin
 Kevin John Conway ... Alec Hill
 Bertie Cortez ... Dr. Cernavoda
 James Crescenzo ... Mr. Luca
 Roger R. Cross ... Derek Worth
 Roger Daltrey ... Hugh Fitzcairn
 Mitch Davies ... Captain Greenwell
 Bob Dawson ... O'Grady
 Anthony De Longis ... Otavio Consone
 Carmen du Sautoy ... Anna Hidalgo
 Nathaniel Deveaux ... Reverend Bell
 Stephen Dimopoulos ... Seth Hobart
 Andrew Divoff ... Gavriel Larca
 Alastair Duncan ... Terence Coventry
 Deborah Epstein ... Luisa Hidalgo
 Martin Evans ... Claus von Stauffenberg
 Kathy Evison ... Jennifer Hill
 Jonathan Firth ... Lord Byron
 Don Foran ... Jerry
 Elsa Franco ... Isabella
 L. Harvey Gold ... Igor Stefanovich
 Patrick Gordon ... Immortal Hermit
 Patrick T. Gorman ... Sergeant Hickson
 Elizabeth Gracen ... Amanda / 4 episodes
 Anna Hagan ... Mary Macleod
 Peter Hanlon ... Karl Brandt
 Kevin Hansen ... Clayton Hobart
 Deryl Hayes ... Andrew Beckmann
 Rachel Hayward ... Delila
 Tom Heaton ... Old Tom
 Philip Heinrich ... Bobby
 Tim Henry ... Detective Dennis Tynan
 Gary Hetherington ... Carlo Capodimonte
 Keith Holmgren ... Gerald
 Peter Hudson ... Ahriman
 Chris Humphreys ... Graham Ashe
 Michael J. Jackson ... Sean Burns
 Edward Jewesbury ... Jason Landry
 Marine Jolivet ... Inspector Begue
 Patrick Keating ... Adolf Hitler
 Tracy Keating ... Mary Shelley
 Eric Keenleyside ... Trey Franks
 Michael Kopsa ... Tommy
 Sotigui Kouyate ... Hijad
 Chris Larkin ... Steven Keane
 Nicholas Lea ... Cory Raines
 Jim Leard ... Detective Frayne / 2 episodes
 David Longworth ... Paxton
 Cluny MacPherson ... Robert Macleod
 F. Braun McAsh ... Hans Kershner
 Tom McBeath ... Sam Grinkhov
 Eric McCormack ... Matthew McCormick
 Chris William Martin ... Carter Wellan
 Greg Michaels ... Tippet
 Frank Middlemass ... Baron Lemartin
 Michel Modo ... Maurice Lalonde
 Robin Mossley ... Jimmy the Weasel
 John Novak ... Gerard Kragen
 Aaron Pearl ... Myron Corman
 Valentine Pelka ... Kronos / 3 episodes
 Ron Perlman ... The Messenger
 Gerard Plunkett ... Roland Kantos
 Christopher J.P. Racasa ... Enrique
 Emily Raymond ... Allison Landry
 Jeffrey Ribier ... Mike Paladini
 Richard Ridings ... Silas / 2 episodes
 Sylvain Rougerie ... James Foulard
 Gerry Rousseau ... Raymond Fairchild
 Tom Russell ... Edward Cervain
 Tracy Scoggins ... Cassandra / 3 episodes
 Stephen J. M. Sisk ... Tim
 Christopher Staines ... Percy Shelley
 Marcia Strassman ... Betsy Fields
 April Telek ... Roxanne
 Richard Temple ... Foster
 Marcus Testory ... Caspian / 2 episodes
 Matthew Thompson ... James
 Elisa Tonati ... Gilda
 Ian Tracey ... Johnny "K" Kelly
 Jan Triska ... Nicolae Breslaw
 Musetta Vander ... Ingrid Henning
 Astrid Veillon ... Desiree
 Marie Vernalde ... Young Anna
 Arturo Venegas ... Don Diego
 Matthew Walker ... Ian MacLeod
 Bob Wilde ... Dominic Delio
 Rhys Williams ... Talbot
 Peter Wingfield ... Methos / 7 episodes
 Robert Wisden ... William Culbraith
 Bruce A. Young ... Carl Robinson

Episodes
This season follows the theme of "forgiveness or regret" as episodes focus on a character coming to terms with the consequences of their actions from their past.

Home media

References

External links
 Highlander: The Series episode list at Epguides
 Highlander: The Series episode list at the Internet Movie Database

5
1996 Canadian television seasons
1997 Canadian television seasons
1996 French television seasons
1997 French television seasons